Leon N. Cooper (born February 28, 1930) is an American physicist and Nobel Prize laureate who, with John Bardeen and John Robert Schrieffer, developed the BCS theory of superconductivity. His name is also associated with the Cooper pair and co-developer of the BCM theory of synaptic plasticity.

Biography and career
Cooper graduated from the Bronx High School of Science in 1947 and received a BA in 1951, MA in 1953, and PhD in 1954 from Columbia University. He spent a year at the Institute for Advanced Study and taught at the University of Illinois and Ohio State University before coming to Brown University in 1958. He has been the Thomas J. Watson Sr. Professor of Science at Brown since 1974, and Director of the Institute for Brain and Neural Systems which he founded in 1973. Along with colleague Charles Elbaum, he founded the tech company Nestor, dedicated to finding commercial applications for artificial neural networks. Nestor, along with Intel, developed the Ni1000 neural network computer chip in 1994.

In 1969 Cooper married Kay Allard. They have two children.

He has carried out research at various institutions including the Institute for Advanced Study and the European Organization for Nuclear Research (CERN) in Geneva, Switzerland.

The character Sheldon Cooper, featured in the CBS comedy The Big Bang Theory, is named in part after Leon Cooper.

Memberships and honors
Fellow of the American Physical Society
Fellow of the American Academy of Arts and Sciences
Member of the National Academy of Sciences
Member of the American Philosophical Society
Member of the American Association for the Advancement of Science
Associate member of the Neuroscience Research Program
Research Fellow of the Alfred P. Sloan Foundation (1959–1966)
Fellow of the Guggenheim Institute (1965–66)
Nobel Prize Recipient for Physics (1972)
Co-winner (with Dr. Schrieffer) of the Comstock Prize in Physics of the National Academy of Sciences (1968)
Received the Award of Excellence, Graduate Faculties Alumni of Columbia University
Received the Descartes Medal, Academie de Paris, Université René Descartes.
Received the John Jay Award of Columbia College (1985)
Recipient of seven honorary doctorates

Publications

Cooper is the author of Science and Human Experience – a collection of essays, including previously unpublished material, on issues such as consciousness and the structure of space.
(Cambridge University Press, 2014).

Cooper is the author of an unconventional liberal-arts physics textbook, originally An Introduction to the Meaning and Structure of Physics (Harper and Row, 1968) and still in print in a somewhat condensed form as Physics: Structure and Meaning (Lebanon: New Hampshire, University Press of New England, 1992).

Cooper, L. N. & J. Rainwater. "Theory of Multiple Coulomb Scattering from Extended Nuclei", Nevis Cyclotron Laboratories at Columbia University, Office of Naval Research (ONR), United States Department of Energy (through predecessor agency the Atomic Energy Commission), (August 1954).
 
 
 
Cooper, L. N., Lee, H. J., Schwartz, B. B. & W. Silvert. "Theory of the Knight Shift and Flux Quantization in Superconductors", Brown University, United States Department of Energy (through predecessor agency the Atomic Energy Commission), (May 1962).
Cooper, L. N. & Feldman, D. "BCS: 50 years", World Scientific Publishing Co., (November 2010).

References

External links

  including the Nobel Lecture, December 11, 1972 Microscopic Quantum Interference Effects in the Theory of Superconductivity
 Brown University researcher profile
 Brown University Physics Department profile
 Critical Review evaluations of Professor Cooper
 

1930 births
Living people
Nobel laureates in Physics
American Nobel laureates
21st-century American physicists
Jewish American physicists
Brown University faculty
People associated with CERN
Columbia Graduate School of Arts and Sciences alumni
Columbia College (New York) alumni
Institute for Advanced Study visiting scholars
Fellows of the American Physical Society
Jewish neuroscientists
Members of the United States National Academy of Sciences
Superconductivity
The Bronx High School of Science alumni
Scientists from New York (state)
Scientists from the Bronx